Subhysteropycnis is a fungal genus in the family Arthoniaceae. This is a monotypic genus, containing the lichenicolous fungus species Subhysteropycnis maculiformans, which is parasitic on Pseudocyphellaria glabra and Pseudocyphellaria homoeophylla.

References

Arthoniomycetes
Monotypic Ascomycota genera
Lichenicolous fungi
Taxa named by Josef Hafellner